Daqing Community is a village-level division of the Malan Subdistrict of Shahekou District, Dalian, Liaoning, China.

References

External links
大庆社区党建网 

Dalian
Communities of China